Cannabis in the Cook Islands is illegal for recreational purposes. A non-binding referendum to legalise it for medicinal purposes passed with 62% in 2022, but legislation has not yet been enacted.

In 2010, Cook Islands Police and New Zealand Police launched Operation Eagle, arresting the son of a prominent local politician, and two former police officers.

In 2022, a referendum legalising medicinal cannabis passed, with 62% voting in favour.

References

 Cook Islands
Society of the Cook Islands